Yuriy Oleksandrovych Smirnov (born 17 August 1948, Buy, Kostroma Oblast, Russia) is a Ukrainian politician. Minister of Internal Affairs of Ukraine in 2001–2003. Colonel general of militsiya.

Biography 
Born 17 August 1948 in the city of Buy, in the Kostroma Oblast of what was then the Russian SFSR.

In 1970, he graduated from the Kharkiv Law University with the specialty of law enforcement.

Smirnov worked in internal services after his army service. Since 1970 he worked in the Ministry of Internal Affairs of the USSR. Held the positions of investigator, inspector, chief of departments and directorates in the Kharkiv and Luhansk Oblasts. 

Since 1997 — Deputy Minister of Internal Affairs for the Southeastern Region — chief of the MVS directorate in the Dnipropetrovsk Oblast.

Since May 2000 — Minister of Internal Affairs, chief of the Main Directorate of the MVS in Kyiv.

26 March 2001 he was appointed as the Minister of Internal Affairs by the decree of the President of Ukraine. In 2001—2003 he was the interior minister of Ukraine. In 2003—2005 Smirnov was an adviser of the President, deputy of the Secretary of the National Security and Defense Council of Ukraine.

Married, has two daughters.

Awards 
: Order of Merit (1st, 2nd, and 3rd class)

External links 
 Biography

1948 births
Living people
People from Buy, Kostroma Oblast
Yaroslav Mudryi National Law University alumni
Interior ministers of Ukraine
Generals of the Internal Service (Ukraine)
Recipients of the Order of Merit (Ukraine), 3rd class
Recipients of the Order of Merit (Ukraine), 2nd class
Recipients of the Order of Merit (Ukraine), 1st class
Recipients of the Honorary Diploma of the Cabinet of Ministers of Ukraine